Richard Oehm (22 June 1909 – 20 May 1975) was a German international footballer.

References

1909 births
1975 deaths
Association football defenders
German footballers
Germany international footballers
1. FC Nürnberg players